Lot is a rare given name, taken from the biblical figure. People with the name include:

 Lot Abu Hassan (born 1984), Malaysian footballer
 Lot Chiwunga (born 1986), Zimbabwean footballer
 Lot Clark (1788–1862), American politician
 Lot Diffey (1877–1952), Australian politician
 Lot Flannery (1836–1922), American sculptor
 Lot Hall (1757–1809), American politician and judge
 Lot Jones (1882–1941), Welsh footballer
 Lot Kapuāiwa, birthname of Kamehameha V (1830–1872), King of Hawaii
 Lot Lane (1864–1953), Hawaiian insurgent
 Lot M. Morrill (1813–1883), American politician
 Lot Norton (1803–1880), American politician
 Lot Smith (1830–1892), Mormon pioneer
 Lot Thomas (1843–1905), American politician and judge
 Lot Torelli (1835–1896), Italian sculptor
 Lot Whitcomb (1807–1857), American businessman and politician
 Lot (monk), Egyptian Christian monk who lived around the 4th and 5th centuries

See also

Lota (name)